Joseph Burns Crowley (July 19, 1858 – June 25, 1931) was a U.S. Representative from Illinois.

Born in Coshocton, Ohio, Crowley moved with his parents to a farm near St. Marie, Jasper County, Illinois, in 1860, and to Robinson, Illinois, in 1872. He attended the common schools. He engaged in mercantile pursuits 1876-1880. He studied law, and was admitted to the bar in May 1883; he began practice at Robinson, Illinois. He served as president of the Robinson city school board 1884-1888, and as master in chancery 1886-1890.

Crowley was elected judge of Crawford County in November 1886, and reelected in 1890. He was appointed United States special Treasury agent in charge of the seal fisheries of Alaska in April 1893, and served until his resignation in April 1898. Crowley was elected as a Democrat to the Fifty-sixth, Fifty-seventh, and Fifty-eighth Congresses (March 4, 1899 – March 3, 1905). He declined to be a candidate for renomination in 1904 and resumed the practice of law in Robinson, Illinois. He served as State's attorney of Crawford County 1912-1916.

He died in Robinson, Illinois, June 25, 1931, and was interred in the old Robinson Cemetery.

References

1858 births
1931 deaths
People from Coshocton, Ohio
Democratic Party members of the United States House of Representatives from Illinois
People from Robinson, Illinois